Blakesley Burkhart is an astrophysicist. She is the winner of the 2019 Annie Jump Cannon Award in Astronomy, which recognizes achievement by a woman post-doctoral researcher in astronomy or a related field. The award cited her work on magnetohydrodynamic turbulence, and for developing innovative techniques for comparing observable astronomical phenomena with theoretical models.

Career
Burkhart completed her Ph.D. in astronomy at the University of Wisconsin–Madison in 2014. Her dissertation explores "connections between theoretical, numerical, and observational understanding of [magnetohydrodynamic turbulence] as it applies to the neutral, ionized, and molecular interstellar medium." She was a post-doctoral fellow at the Center for Astrophysics  Harvard & Smithsonian. There she worked with Mark R. Krumholz and others to develop a unified model of disc galaxies, working to explain why disc galaxies have a lower rate of star formation than is predicted by other models. She also worked on the KickSat-2 femtosatellite project with Zac Manchester. In August 2018, she became an associate research scientist at the Flatiron Institute's Center for Computational Astrophysics. She has been working as an assistant professor at Rutgers University in the department of Physics and Astronomy since September 2019.

She was the host of the 5 Minute Astronomy podcast from 89.9FM WORT in Madison.

Selected publications

Selected lecture videos
 "The Photon Underproduction Crisis Solved: The Effect of AGN Feedback on the Low Redshift Lyman-alpha Forest", Institute for Theory and Computation, February 8, 2018
 Dr. Burkhart lecturing on “Galaxies as Star-Forming Engines: Simulating the Turbulent Birth of Stars”, Radcliffe Institute for Advanced Study, Harvard, October 14, 2016

Awards received
 Jansky Award, University of Wisconsin–Madison, Department of Astronomy, 2011
NASA's Wisconsin Space Grant Fellowship, 2013-14
 Robert J. Trumpler Award, 2017
 Annie Jump Cannon Award in Astronomy, 2019
Packard Fellowship for Science and Engineering, 2020
 Alfred P. Sloan Fellowship, 2021
 Maria Goeppert-Mayer Award, 2022

References

External links
 
 Feature article in Rutgers University student newspaper
 Profile from University of Wisconsin Department of Astronomy
 

Year of birth missing (living people)
Living people
American astrophysicists
American women physicists
Rutgers University faculty
University of Wisconsin–Madison alumni
Women astrophysicists
Recipients of the Annie J. Cannon Award in Astronomy
American women academics
21st-century American women